Iracema  may refer to:
 Iracema, an 1865 novel published by Brazilian author José de Alencar
 Iracema (1917 film), a Brazilian silent film adaptation
 Iracema (1949 film), a Brazilian film adaptation
 Iracema: Uma Transa Amazônica, a 1976 Brazilian film very loosely based on the novel

Geography (all in Brazil)
Municipalities
 Iracema, Ceará
 Iracema, Roraima
 Iracema do Oeste, Paraná
 Iracemápolis, São Paulo
 São João de Iracema, São Paulo

Other geographic features
 Iracema River in Santa Catarina state
 Iracema oil field, Santos Basin off the coast of Rio de Janeiro
 Praia de Iracema (Iracema Beach), beach and a neighborhood in Fortaleza

People
 Hedy Iracema-Brügelmann (1879–1941), a German operatic soprano of Brazilian birth
 Iracema de Alencar (1900–1978), Brazilian actress
 Iracema Trevisan (b. 1982), Brazilian musician and fashion designer

Other
 Iracema (fish), a genus of fish
 Iracema spider, former name for the Bumba (spider) genus